Moses Little Tavern is a historic building in Laboratory, Pennsylvania.

It is designated as a historic residential landmark/farmstead by the Washington County History & Landmarks Foundation.

References

External links
[ National Register nomination form]

Hotel buildings on the National Register of Historic Places in Pennsylvania
Houses completed in 1840
Houses in Washington County, Pennsylvania
Taverns in Pennsylvania
National Register of Historic Places in Washington County, Pennsylvania
Drinking establishments on the National Register of Historic Places in Pennsylvania
1840 establishments in Pennsylvania